Albena Petrovic-Vratchanska (born 20 October 1965 in Sofia, Bulgaria) is a composer, pianist and musical pedagogue.

In 2007 she received the prestigious commission of the Cultural Year 2007 in Luxembourg and the Greater Region for the composition of "Gladius" for electric guitar and instrumental ensemble.
The Cultural Commission and Madam Mayor, Mrs. Theresa Gantenbein, granted her the "Cultural Award" and also the title of merits for services rendered to the cultural life of the municipality of Hesperange on the event of Excellence Awards. In 2007 she became a Jury member of the International Composition Competition "Valentino Bucchi" in Rome, Italy, representing Luxembourg. Very active as a composer, she devotes much of her creative energy to the musical CBT and teaching of young talented children. The idea, concept and creation of the Club “Artistes en Herbe” are in large part due to her efforts. Consequently, she is President-Founder of the International Composition Competition “Artistes en Herbe” under the patronage of the Ministry of Culture of Luxembourg. Master in Musical Composition and Notation, she has been granted awards for piano, solfège, music theory, composition and musical analysis. She has taken her place among the Luxembourgian composers, and has written more than 600 works in various music genres.

References

External links
Programme mentioning Chorale Ste Cécile de Mertert, Directioun: Albena PETROVIC-VRATCHANSKA at Merter-Musek.lu
Künstlerinnen komponieren, dichten, malen für Kinder: Nicole Paulus, Albena Petrovic Vratchanska, Catrin Raber: Wann de Piano rose gëtt. Luxemburg Cid-Femmes.lu
'Das musikalische Kinderbuch "Wann de Piano rose gëtt" ist das stolze Resultat eines Künstlerinnenauftrags... die Komponistin Albena Petrovic-Vratchanska' at Cid-Femmes.lu via web.archive.org
Kunstlerinnen Biografie Albena Petrovic-Vratchanska Komponistin und Pianistin at Kek.lu
Kinder Entdecken Kunstlerinnen: Künstlerinnen - Musik at Kek.lu
KOMPONISTINNEN ENTDECKEN UNTERRICHTSMAPPE FÜR LEHRERINNEN UND LEHRER DER VOR- UND PRIMÄRSCHULEN at Public.lu via web.archive.org
INECC.lu
Archive de l'INSTITUT EUROPÉEN DE CHANT CHORAL LUXEMBOURG- cours bref 'Musiques populaires russes', avec Intervenant: Albena PETROVIC-VRATCHANSKA at INECC.lu via web.archive.org
Genios.de
27/06/2016 Bonner General-Anzeiger / FEU  Abgesang mit Flöte und Harfe / Die aktuelle Kammermusiksaison des Beethoven Orchesters neigt sich dem Ende. Und damit auch ... (Farewell with flute and harp / The current chamber music season of the Beethoven Orchestra is coming to an end. And therefore ... ... Including) ... Albena Petrovic-Vratchanska ... at genios.de
Mention of "Wann de Piano rose gët" at Land.lu via web.archive.org
'Ad alta voce: Littérature et musique au féminin', 19 juin 2003, at Literatirarchiv.lu
Plurio.lu
'La poétesse luxembourgeoise Anise Koltz... entretient toujours - des relations fructueuses avec de nombreux poètes, écrivains et artistes... (...Albena Petrovic-Vratchanska...).' Littérature: Anise Koltz honorée - Le Quotidien, 06/03/2009 via web.archive.org
"Gladius", 17.10.2007, Sonothèque: oeuvres enregistrées par Noise Watchers Unlimited, at Nowa.lu via web.archive.org

1965 births
Living people
21st-century composers
21st-century pianists
21st-century women composers
Bulgarian composers
Bulgarian pianists
Bulgarian emigrants to Luxembourg
Luxembourgian composers
Musicians from Sofia
Women classical pianists
21st-century women pianists